Lindsay Elizabeth Ell (born 20 March 1989) is a Canadian-American country pop singer, songwriter, guitarist and television personality from Calgary, Alberta. Her music incorporates elements of rock and blues.  She is signed to the US record label Stoney Creek Records, an imprint of Broken Bow Records. Her debut extended play, Worth the Wait, was released in March 2017. Her first full-length country album, The Project, was released in August 2017 and debuted at No. 1 on the Billboard Country Album Sales chart.

Early life
Lindsay Ell was born in Calgary. She started playing the piano at six, until she discovered her father's collection of guitars scattered throughout the house, switching at age eight; "I fell in love with the guitar," says Lindsay. "It's a huge part of who I am." Lindsay fell in love with the blues and started songwriting at age 10. Ell was valedictorian for her class at Bishop Carroll High School, from which she graduated a year early. She went on to study business at the University of Calgary and music at the Berklee College of Music, in addition to pursuing her music career.

Ell officially became an American citizen on December 8, 2022.

Career
Randy Bachman discovered Ell when she was only 15 years old. Bachman described her as "the most talented and multi-faceted artist I've come across in many years". Bachman co-wrote and produced her first album Consider This. It was recorded at Bachman's studio on Saltspring Island, and Ell herself co-wrote most of the 11 songs. The album was released in 2006 on Bachman's record label Ranbach Music and distributed by Fontana North. Ell toured with blues guitarist Buddy Guy in 2008. On her 2009 album, Alone, she moved to a more acoustic sound compared to her debut.

It was her first songwriting trip to Nashville that brought her full circle to her country roots. She travelled back and forth from Calgary to Nashville for a couple years to participate in songwriting sessions while playing as many live shows as she could to hone her craft. At the age of 21, she permanently moved to Nashville and signed with the US-based record label Stoney Creek Records.

In December 2013, her first official single, "Trippin' on Us", debuted as the most added song for country music radio in both Canada and the United States with over 50 first week adds. Ell has since been called "a true triple threat" by Guitar World; "a star in the making" by Taste of Country and "a distinct figure in the modern country recording camp" by Country Weekly. Lindsay is a guitarist whose style has been influenced by John Mayer, Keith Urban, Stevie Ray Vaughan, Tommy Emmanuel, Chet Atkins, Buddy Guy, Randy Bachman, Eric Clapton and Jimi Hendrix. She typically plays a custom Les Paul Goddess and Martin acoustic guitars. She is an official Martin Guitar artist.

Lindsay made her Grand Ole Opry debut on 15 April 2014 and has since made several appearances on the show. On 24 March 2017, Lindsay released her debut EP, Worth the Wait, featuring six songs, one of which is a cover of John Mayer's "Stop This Train." "Worth the Wait shows off Ell’s talent in all capacities, as a guitarist, vocalist and songwriter," wrote Sounds Like Nashville in a review of the project. On 28 January 2018, Lindsay sang the Canadian National Anthem at the 2018 NHL All-Star Game. In March 2018, she performed at the C2C: Country to Country festival in the UK. On July 29, 2020 upon her label's request Lindsay flew to Nashville to perform a remix as a guest artist on her label mate Tucker Beathard's newly released single titled "Faithful". The track was the first promotional single released upon the announcement Beathard's upcoming album titled KING, however the version that features her was left off of the album and was instead only able to be streamed via YouTube.

On August 14, 2020, Ell released her fifth studio album, Heart Theory, featuring the singles "I Don't Love You", "Want Me Back", and "Good on You". In October 2021, it was announced that Ell will host the second season of Canada's Got Talent, which aired in 2022. She served alongside Priyanka as cohost of the 2021 Canadian Country Music Awards.

Personal life 
In February 2023, she revealed that she has been battling an eating disorder for many years that was only recently diagnosed.

Tours
We Are Pioneers World Tour (2013/2014) – supporting The Band Perry 
CMT Next Women of Country Tour (2016) – supporting Jennifer Nettles 
Life Amplified World Tour (2017) – supporting Brad Paisley 
Weekend Warrior World Tour (2017/2018) – supporting Brad Paisley
Still the Same Tour (2018) - supporting Sugarland
Graffiti U World Tour (2018) – supporting Keith Urban
Monster Energy Outbreak Tour (2018/2019) - headlining
Friends and Heroes Tour (2021) - supporting Blake Shelton
wAnt me back tour (2021) - headlining, with Robyn Ottolini supporting 

Lindsay Ell was selected by The Band Perry to open for their "We Are Pioneers World Tour" which included 50 dates throughout Europe and North America during 2013 and 2014. She has also supported tours with Keith Urban, Luke Bryan, Buddy Guy, Big & Rich, Gretchen Wilson, Ronnie Dunn, Paul Brandt, Chris Isaak and Blake Shelton. In 2021, Lindsay Ell completed her first Canadian headlining tour, with special guest Robyn Ottolini supporting.

Discography

 Consider This (2008)
 Alone (2009)
 The Project (2017)
 The Continuum Project (2018)
 Heart Theory (2020)

Awards and nominations

References

External links
 Lindsay Ell official website
 Lindsay Ell discography at Allmusic

1989 births
Living people
Musicians from Calgary
Canadian women guitarists
Canadian women country singers
Canadian ukulele players
American country singer-songwriters
21st-century Canadian women singers
21st-century Canadian guitarists
Canadian television hosts
21st-century women guitarists